The GNU Data Language (GDL) is a free alternative to IDL (Interactive Data Language), achieving full compatibility with IDL 7 and partial compatibility with IDL 8. Together with its library routines, GDL is developed to serve as a tool for data analysis and visualization in such disciplines as astronomy, geosciences, and medical imaging.
GDL is licensed under the GPL. Other open-source numerical data analysis tools similar to GDL include Julia, Jupyter Notebook, GNU Octave, NCAR Command Language (NCL), Perl Data Language (PDL), R, Scilab, SciPy, and Yorick.

GDL as a language is dynamically-typed, vectorized, and has object-oriented programming capabilities. GDL library routines handle numerical calculations (e.g. FFT), data visualisation, signal/image processing, interaction with host OS, and data input/output. GDL supports several data formats, such as NetCDF, HDF (v4 & v5), GRIB, PNG, TIFF, and DICOM. Graphical output is handled by X11, PostScript, SVG, or z-buffer terminals, the last one allowing output graphics (plots) to be saved in raster graphics formats. GDL features integrated debugging facilities, such as breakpoints. GDL has a Python bridge (Python code can be called from GDL; GDL can be compiled as a Python module). GDL uses Eigen (C++ library) numerical library (similar to Intel MKL) to offer high computing performance on multi-core processors.

Packaged versions of GDL are available for several Linux and BSD flavours as well as Mac OS X. The source code compiles on Microsoft Windows and other UNIX systems, including Solaris.

GDL is not an official GNU package.

See also

 Interpreter (computing)
 IDL (programming language)

References

External links
 
 Running the GNU Data Language on coLinux
 
 Linux packages: ArchLinux, Debian, Fedora, Gentoo, Ubuntu,
 BSD/OSX ports: Fink, FreeBSD, Macports

Free science software
Free software programmed in C++
Data language
Numerical programming languages
Software that uses wxWidgets